Kearny is a town in Pinal County, Arizona, United States. The town was named after General Stephen Watts Kearny, who passed through the area on November 7, 1846, while leading 100 dragoons to California. According to the 2010 census, the population of the town is 1,950. The economic base of Kearny and nearby towns is the Ray mine and Hayden Smelter, both owned and operated by ASARCO.

History
Kearny was built by the Kennecott Mining Company in 1958 as a planned community to accommodate the populations of nearby Ray, Sonora and Barcelona, which were about to be swallowed by Kennecott's expanding open-pit copper mine. While many houses in the town were newly built, some mine employees had their homes moved down the road. Kearny was officially incorporated in 1959.

Geography
Kearny is located at  (33.054160, -110.908857).

The town sits near the Gila River in the Copper Basin area along with its sister cities, Hayden and Winkelman.

Climate
According to the Köppen Climate Classification system, Kearny has a warm-summer Mediterranean climate, abbreviated "Csa" on climate maps.

Demographics

As of the census of 2000, there were 2,249 people, 791 households, and 616 families residing in the town. The racial makeup of the town was 77.3% White, 0.3% Black or African American, 0.8% Native American, 0.1% Asian, 18.4% from other races, and 3.2% from two or more races. 38.4% of the population were Hispanic or Latino of any race.

There were 791 households, out of which 34.8% had children under the age of 18 living with them, 65.0% were married couples living together, 9.2% had a female householder with no husband present, and 22.1% were non-families. 19.1% of all households were made up of individuals, and 10.6% had someone living alone who was 65 years of age or older. The average household size was 2.84 and the average family size was 3.25.

In the town, the population was spread out, with 29.9% under the age of 18, 7.6% from 18 to 24, 21.7% from 25 to 44, 26.7% from 45 to 64, and 14.1% who were 65 years of age or older. The median age was 37 years. For every 100 females, there were 96.8 males. For every 100 females age 18 and over, there were 89.5 males.

The median income for a household in the town was $39,906, and the median income for a family was $42,313. Males had a median income of $40,056 versus $23,684 for females. The per capita income for the town was $16,797. About 12.1% of families and 13.2% of the population were below the poverty line, including 16.0% of those under age 18 and 19.9% of those age 65 or over.

Education
Kearny is part of the Ray Unified School District, made up of two schools: Ray Junior-Senior High School, and Ray Elementary School.

Transportation
Kearny Airport is a general aviation airport located in the southern section of the town. In 2003 it received the Arizona Department of Transportation's Airport of the Year award.

Images

See also

 List of cities and towns in Arizona
 Ray, Arizona

References

External links

 
 Ray Unified School District
 Copper Basin Chamber of Commerce
  History of the Kearny area
 How Kearny got its history

Towns in Pinal County, Arizona
Company towns in Arizona
Populated places established in 1958
1958 establishments in Arizona
Mining communities in Arizona